Kandrian Airport is an airport in Kandrian, in the West New Britain Province of Papua New Guinea.

Facilities

Airlines and destinations
(no known scheduled services)

References

External links
 

Airports in Papua New Guinea
West New Britain Province